The 1980–81 Arizona State Sun Devils men's basketball team represented the Arizona State University during the 1980–81 NCAA Division I men's basketball season.

Roster

Schedule

|-
!colspan=12 style=| Regular season

|-
!colspan=12 style=|NCAA Tournament

References 

Arizona State
Arizona State Sun Devils
Arizona State Sun Devils men's basketball seasons
Arizona State Sun Devils
Arizona State